The gravitational wave background (also GWB and stochastic background) is a random gravitational-wave signal potentially detectable by gravitational wave detection experiments. Since the background is supposed to be statistically random, it has yet been researched only in terms of such statistical descriptors as the mean, the variance, etc.

Sources of a stochastic background 
Several potential sources for the background are hypothesized across various frequency bands of interest, with each source producing a background with different statistical properties. The sources of the stochastic background can be broadly divided into two categories: cosmological sources, and astrophysical sources.

Cosmological sources 
Cosmological backgrounds may arise from several early universe sources. Some examples of these sources include time-varying scalar (classical) fields in the early universe, "preheating" mechanisms after inflation involving energy transfer from inflaton particles to regular matter, phase transitions in the early universe (such as the electroweak phase transition), cosmic strings, etc. While these sources are more hypothetical, a detection of a background from them would be a major discovery of new physics. The detection of such an inflationary background would have a profound impact on early-universe cosmology and on high-energy physics.

Astrophysical sources 
An astrophysical background is produced by the confused noise of many weak, independent, and unresolved astrophysical sources. For instance the astrophysical background from stellar mass binary black-hole mergers is expected to be a key source of the stochastic background for the current generation of ground based gravitational-wave detectors. LIGO and Virgo detectors have already detected individual gravitational-wave events from such black-hole mergers. However, there would be a large population of such mergers which would not be individually resolvable which would produce a hum of random looking noise in the detectors. Other astrophysical sources which are not individually resolvable can also form a background. For instance, a sufficiently massive star at the final stage of its evolution will collapse to form either a black hole or a neutron star – in the rapid collapse during the final moments of an explosive supernova event, which can lead to such formations, gravitational waves may theoretically be liberated. Also, in rapidly rotating neutron stars there is a whole class of instabilities driven by the emission of gravitational waves.

The nature of source also depend on the sensitive frequency band of the signal. The current generation of ground based experiments like LIGO and Virgo are sensitive to gravitational-waves in the audio frequency band between approximately 10 Hz to 1000 Hz. In this band the most likely source of the stochastic background will be an astrophysical background from binary neutron-star and stellar mass binary black-hole mergers.

Detection 
On 11 February 2016, the LIGO and Virgo collaborations announced the first direct detection and observation of gravitational waves, which took place in September 2015.  In this case, two black holes had collided to produce detectable gravitational waves.  This is the first step to the potential detection of a GWB.

See also 

 Cosmic microwave background
 Cosmic neutrino background

References

External links 
 Gravitational Wave Experiments and Early Universe Cosmology

Effects of gravitation
background
Gravitational-wave astronomy
Cosmic background radiation